The sexual abuse scandal in Dubuque archdiocese is a major chapter in the series of Catholic sex abuse cases in the United States and Ireland.

Diocesan response
The archdiocese has responded to this crisis by creating a policy for protecting minors; it also created a review board for dealing with issues of abuse, and has agreed to pay for counseling for victims.  Reaction to these policy changes has been mixed.  Some people feel that the archdiocese is not being as cooperative as it could be, and feel that more could be done.  At the same time, others feel that the archdiocese is doing what it can in a very difficult situation.

Like many other dioceses, in the past the archdiocese had tried to handle such problems quietly through sending the offender to treatment followed by quiet reassignment.  The archdiocese has been accused of being slow to respond to this crisis, and of not doing enough to prevent this from happening. Almost immediately after taking office, Archbishop Hanus was forced to deal with a case of sexual abuse by a Dubuque area priest.  Most of these incidents of abuse took place on church property.

Robert Reiss affair
In 1997, accused Archdiocese of Dubuque "predator priest" Robert Reiss was defrocked by the Vatican. He was later found dead in Mexico in 2005 under mysterious circumstances. It was believed that he was murdered. Following the death of Reiss, then-Archbishop of Dubuque Jerome Hanus called for more sex victims to come forward.

Settlements by archbishop Hanus
Archbishop Jerome Hanus has had to deal with the sexual abuse crisis that has rocked the church in recent times. Soon after he became archbishop, a Dubuque area priest had been found to have abused a number of boys while working at Saint Columbkille's church in Dubuque. He has also had to deal with sexual abuse cases which involved a number of priests, both living and deceased. In February 2006 he, along with Bishop Charron of Des Moines and Bishop Franklin of Davenport, met with victim's advocate groups. (Sioux City Bishop Nickless was scheduled to attend but his mother died just before the meeting.) Then on February 21, 2006 the archdiocese settled a number of claims, and the Archbishop offered a personal apology.

William Roach affair
In 2002, a man living in Dallas, Texas, filed a lawsuit against the archdiocese in which he claimed that he had been abused by Msgr. William Roach in 1962.  At the time, Roach worked at Immaculate Conception Catholic Church in Cedar Rapids, Iowa.  The man, who was 17 at the time, claimed that Roach and another priest abused him and another young person.  Two other men have also claimed to have been abused by Roach, including NBC reporter Jim Cummins, who filed 15 lawsuits over forty years after he had been sexually abused. 

Roach worked in parishes in Key West, Waukon, Cascade, and Oxford Junction.  He also worked at Holy Family in Peosta, Iowa, and Holy Ghost parish in Dubuque.  Roach died in an automobile accident in 1986, and was legally intoxicated at the time of the accident.

William Goltz affair
On January 7, 2006, the Rev. William Goltz—one of the archdiocesan priests accused of sexual abuse—died in Prairie du Chien, Wisconsin. Goltz was accused of abusing boys during the 1950s and showing pornographic pictures to them as well.  Goltz was named in three lawsuits.  He retired in 1991, and in 1992 Goltz was barred by the Vatican from celebrating Mass or representing himself publicly as a priest.  In 2005 the Vatican further ordered him to spend the remainder of his life in prayer and penance. While legal actions against Goltz ended with his death, the suits against the archdiocese remain and will be continued.

Jim Cummins lawsuit
Jim Cummins, an NBC reporter, alleged that he was sexually molested by his parish priest, reverend William Roach, when he was a 17-year-old altar boy in 1962. The abuse took place on two occasions, each one accompanied by an additional, different priest. Roach went on to molest at least two more teenage boys and worked for the northeast Iowa Catholic parishes for another 24 years before being killed while driving intoxicated.

The memories caused serious psychological troubles for Cummins including panic attacks and inability to work with others, but he continued to suppress them for over four decades. It wasn't until 2002 that Cummins came face to face with his demons while interviewing the family of a suicide victim - a young man who couldn't handle the abuse he received by a priest. Cummins contacted a Waterloo law firm and in June 2004 filed the first of 15 lawsuits which would be brought against the Archdiocese of Dubuque and priests accused of child molestation. 

In February 2006, he spoke with Dubuque Archbishop Jerome Hanus about his troubled past and later commended Hanus for his sincere remorse. Debbie Gindhart, another victim of Waterloo-based sexual abuse, also noted her content with the outcome of her case.

Priest in Marion
In 2000, another priest from the Marion, Iowa, area had been found to be engaging in inappropriate activity on the internet.  While this priest had not abused any children, the impropriety had damaged the level of trust between members of the parish and the church.  The priest in question was transferred out of parish work; he later died in an automobile accident.

Old cases
A number of cases of past abuse have also come up—some from as long as 60 years ago.  Some new claims have recently been made against a deceased priest; the parishes he served at have been notified of these claims, and the archdiocese has encouraged victims to come forward.  Recently, the archdiocese released to the media the names and pictures of those priests—both living and deceased—that had been accused or found guilty of sexual abuse.  It also gave their current status.  On February 21, 2006, the archdiocese announced that it had reached settlements with several victims worth an estimated five million dollars, which will be paid from the archdiocese's self-insurance program.

References

Catholic Church sexual abuse scandals in the United States